Stefan Lucks is a researcher in the fields of communications security and cryptography. Lucks is known for his attack on Triple DES, and for extending Lars Knudsen's Square attack to Twofish, a cipher outside the Square family, thus generalising the attack  into integral cryptanalysis.  He has also co-authored attacks on AES, LEVIATHAN, and the E0 cipher used in Bluetooth devices, as well as publishing strong password-based key agreement schemes.

Lucks graduated from the University of Dortmund in 1992, and received his PhD at the University of Göttingen in 1997.
After leaving the University of Mannheim Lucks now heads the Chair of Media Security at Bauhaus University, Weimar.

Together with Niels Ferguson, Bruce Schneier and others he developed the Skein hash function as a candidate for the NIST hash function competition.

External links
 Chair of Media Security (Bauhaus-University Weimar)
 Home Page (Bauhaus-University Weimar)

1965 births
Living people
Modern cryptographers
German cryptographers
Technical University of Dortmund alumni
University of Göttingen alumni
Academic staff of the University of Mannheim
Academic staff of Bauhaus University, Weimar